The Mayoan age is a period of geologic time from 11.8 to 10 Ma, within the Middle to Late Miocene epoch of the Neogene, used more specifically within the SALMA classification in South America. It follows the Laventan and precedes the Chasicoan age.

Etymology 
The age is named after the Río Mayo Formation in the Golfo San Jorge Basin of Patagonia, Argentina.

Formations

Fossil content

References

Bibliography 
Río Mayo Formation
 

Coquimbo Formation
 

Gran Bajo del Gualicho Formation
 

Huaylas Formation
 
 

Mauri Formation
 

Navidad Formation
 

Paraná Formation
 
 

Pebas Formation
 
 

Pisco Formation
 
 
 
 
 
 
 
 
 
 
 
 
 
 

Puerto Madryn Formation
 
 

Urumaco Formation
 
 
 
 
 

Yecua Formation
 

 
Miocene South America
Neogene Argentina